The Canton of Burie is a French former administrative division in the Département  Charente-Maritime and the region Poitou-Charentes. It was disbanded following the French canton reorganisation which came into effect in March 2015. It consisted of 10 communes, which joined the canton of Chaniers in 2015. It had 7,201 inhabitants (2012).

Communes of Burie
The canton comprised the following communes:

Burie
Chérac
Dompierre-sur-Charente
Écoyeux
Migron
Saint-Bris-des-Bois
Saint-Césaire
Saint-Sauvant
Le Seure
Villars-les-Bois

See also 
 Cantons of the Charente-Maritime department

References

Former cantons of Charente-Maritime
Nouvelle-Aquitaine region articles needing translation from French Wikipedia
2015 disestablishments in France
States and territories disestablished in 2015